is a Japanese voice actor. He is affiliated with Stay Luck. He voiced Nero in Devil May Cry, Genos in One Punch Man, Tenya Iida in My Hero Academia and Tobio Kageyama in Haikyu!!.

Biography
Ishikawa performed in a production of Gamba's Great Adventure at a science society when he was in fifth grade. After graduating from high school, he joined a drama club. After making his debut, he was impressed when he heard about the concept of "living a role" from a colleague. After immersing himself in late-night anime like The Familiar of Zero, he pursued roles in Kanon and Genesis of Aquarion. He praised Hiroaki Hirata for voicing Jack Sparrow in Pirates of the Caribbean. Ishikawa entered the Pro Fit Voice Actor Training Center with the money he earned from his part-time job. In 2012, he made his anime debut in Waiting in the Summer. In April 2013, he played the first leading role in the anime series Gargantia on the Verdurous Planet. He won the Best Rookie actor at the 8th Seiyu Awards and the Best Actor in a Supporting Role award at the 14th Seiyu Awards.

Filmography

Anime series
{| class="wikitable sortable plainrowheaders"
! Year
! Series
! Role
! class="unsortable"| Notes
! class="unsortable"| Source
|-
| 2012 || Waiting in the Summer || Student B, Student C ||  || 
|-
| 2012 || Phi-Brain - Puzzle of God: The Orpheus Order || Male Student || Ep. 4 || 
|-
| 2012 || Hyouka || Baseball team member || || 
|-
| 2012 || Tari Tari || Mailman, Gamba White || || 
|-
| 2012 || To Love-Ru: Darkness || Male Students || || 
|-
| 2012 || Say I Love You || Taku ||  || 
|-
| 2012 || The Pet Girl of Sakurasou || Guest 2, Young Man 2 ||  || 
|-
| 2012 || Muv-Luv Alternative: Total Eclipse || Nikolai Rogoshkin ||  || 
|-
| 2013 || AKB0048 Next Stage || WOTA ||  || 
|-
| 2013 || RDG Red Data Girl || Manatsu Sōda ||  || 
|-
| 2013 || Gargantia on the Verdurous Planet || Ledo ||   || 
|-
| 2013 || A Certain Scientific Railgun S || Anti-skill, Bad Guy, Black Suit, Judgment (Otoko), Schoolboy, Subordinate, Student, Staff Member  ||  || 
|-
| 2013 || The "Hentai" Prince and the Stony Cat. || Schoolboy E ||  || 
|-
| 2013 || Chronicles of the Going Home Club || Masao Kaneda || Ep. 12 || 
|-
| 2013 || The Eccentric Family || Daigakusei ||  || 
|-
| 2013 || Super Seisyun Brothers || Mao Saitou ||   || 
|-
| 2013 || Golden Time || Mitsuo Yanagisawa ||   || 
|-
| 2013 || Nagi-Asu: A Lull in the Sea || Tsumugu Kihara ||   ||  
|-
| 2013 || Ace of Diamond || Shun-chen Yang ||   || 
|-
| 2013 || Kuroko's Basketball 2 || Kensuke Fukui ||   || 
|-
| 2013 || Inazuma Eleven GO Galaxy || Hayato Matatagi, Qasim Badr ||   || 
|-
| 2013 || Tokyo Ravens || Harutora Tsuchimikado ||   || 
|-
| 2014—2020 || Haikyu!! || Tobio Kageyama ||   || 
|-
| 2014 || Nobunaga The Fool || Charlemagne ||   || 
|-
| 2014 || The Pilot's Love Song || Ignacio Axis ||   || 
|-
| 2014 || Romantica Clock || Aoi Kajiya ||   || 
|-
| 2014 || Ace of Diamond || Shun-chen Yang ||   || 
|-
| 2014 || Atelier Escha & Logy: Alchemists of the Dusk Sky || Logix Fiscario (anime adaptation) ||   || 
|-
| 2014 || Terror in Resonance || Nine/Arata Kokonoe ||   || 
|-
| 2014 || Strange+ Season 2 || Kanno ||   || 
|-
| 2014 || Terra Formars || Marcos Garcia ||   || 
|-
| 2014 || Lord Marksman and Vanadis || Tigrevurmud Vorn ||   || 
|-
| 2014 || Marvel Disk Wars: The Avengers || Sam Wilson/The Falcon ||   || 
|-
| 2014 || Celestial Method || Sota Mizusaka ||   || 
|-
| 2014 || Hero Bank || Sekito Sakurada ||   || 
|-
| 2015 || World Break: Aria of Curse for a Holy Swordsman || Moroha Haimura ||   || 
|-
| 2015 || Assassination Classroom || Ren Sakakibara ||   || 
|-
| 2015 || Seraph of the End || Shiho Kimizuki || Also Season 2, which aired in 2015 || 
|-
| 2015 || High School DxD BorN || Arthur Pendragon ||   || 
|-
| 2015 || World Trigger || Kohei Izumi ||   || 
|-
| 2015—2017 || Kyōkai no Rinne || Rinne Rokudou || 3rd season in 2017 || 
|-
| 2015 || Gangsta. || Cody Balfour ||   || 
|-
| 2015 || Q-Transformers Season 2 || Shockwave ||   || 
|-
| 2015 || Gate || Takeo Kurata ||   || 
|-
| 2015 || Heavy Object || Havia Winchell ||   || 
|-
| 2015—2019 || One-Punch Man || Genos ||   || 
|-
| 2015 || Concrete Revolutio || Jirō Hitoyoshi ||   || 
|-
| 2015 ||Yu-Gi-Oh! Arc-V||Shinji Weber|| || 
|-
| 2015 || Noragami Aragoto || Koto Fujisaki ||   || 
|-
| 2016 || Prince of Stride: Alternative || Shiki Dozono || || 
|-
| 2016—present || My Hero Academia || Tenya Iida, Manga Fukidashi ||   || 
|-
| 2016 || Kuromukuro || Ryoto Akagi ||   || 
|-
|2016
|Re:Zero
|Wilhelm van Astrea (young)
|
|
|-
| 2016 || Twin Star Exorcists || Shimon Ikaruga ||   || 
|-
| 2016 || Macross Delta || Roid Brehm ||   ||
|-
| 2016 || Terra Formars Revenge ||Marcos Garcia ||   || 
|-
| 2016 || First Love Monster ||Atsushi Taga ||   || 
|-
| 2016 ||Occultic;Nine ||Sarai Hashigami ||  || 
|-
| 2016 ||Bungo Stray Dogs ||Taguchi Rokuzou ||  ||
|-
| 2016 ||Days ||Tetsuya Nitobe||  || 
|-
| 2016 ||Battery ||Keita Higashidani ||  ||
|-
| 2016 ||Servamp ||Shuhei Tsuyuki ||  ||
|-
| 2016 ||Touken Ranbu: Hanamaru ||Kasen Kanesada ||  || 
|-
| 2016—2019 || Pocket Monsters: Sun & Moon || Kaki (Kiawe) ||  || 
|-
| 2017 || Hand Shakers || Hayate || || 
|-
| 2017 || Sagrada Reset || Kei Asai || ||
|-
| 2017 || Chronos Ruler || Kiri Putin || ||
|-
| 2017 || Tsuredure Children || Takurō Sugawara || ||
|-
| 2018 || Dame x Prince Anime Caravan || Narek Ishru de Mildonia || ||
|-
| 2018 || Beatless || Kaidai Ryou || ||
|-
| 2018 || Pop Team Epic || Pipimi   || ||
|-
| 2018 || Tokyo Ghoul:re || Kuki Urie || ||
|-
| 2018 || Space Battleship Tiramisu || Subaru Ichinose ||  || 
|-
| 2018 || Kakuriyo: Bed and Breakfast for Spirits || Ranmaru || || <ref>{{cite web|url=https://www.animenewsnetwork.com/news/2018-03-08/kakuriyo-yadomeshi-anime-new-video-unveils-more-cast-april-2-debut/.128714|title=Kaito Ishikawa, Takuma Terashima, Daisuke Hirakawa voice rival inn characters|publisher=Anime News Network|date=March 8, 2018|access-date=March 8, 2018}}</ref>
|-
| 2018 ||Touken Ranbu: Hanamaru 2 ||Kasen Kanesada ||  || 
|-
| 2018 || Magical Girl Ore || Saki Uno (male) || || 
|-
| 2018 || Last Hope || Four || ||
|-
| 2018 || Happy Sugar Life || Daichi Kitaumekawa || replacing Yuichiro Umehara||
|-
| 2018 || Kyōto Teramachi Sanjō no Holmes || Kiyotaka Yagashira || ||
|-
| 2018 || Seven Senses of the Re'Union || Takanori Mikado || ||
|-
| 2018 || Zoids Wild || Drake || ||
|-
| 2018 || Rascal Does Not Dream of Bunny Girl Senpai || Sakuta Azusagawa || ||
|-
| 2018 || Karakuri Circus || Hiroo 'Hiro" Nakamachi || ||
|-
| 2018 || Tsurune || Kaito Onogi || ||  
|-
| 2018 || Overlord || Hekkeran Termite || 3rd Season Ep. 6-7 || 
|-
| 2018 || JoJo's Bizarre Adventure: Golden Wind || Sale || ||  
|-
| 2018—2021 || Black Clover || Langris Vaude || || 
|-
| 2019—present || The Rising of the Shield Hero || Naofumi Iwatani || || 
|-
| 2019 || To the Abandoned Sacred Beasts || Claude Withers || || 
|-
| 2019 || How Heavy Are the Dumbbells You Lift? || Naruzō Machio || || 
|-
| 2019 || Ensemble Stars! || Tsumugi Aoba || ||  
|-
| 2019 || Kochoki: Wakaki Nobunaga || Oda Nobuyuki || || 
|-
| 2019 || Psycho-Pass 3 || Torri S. Aschenbach || ||
|-
| 2020 || number24 || Kazutaka Hongō || || 
|-
| 2020 || Isekai Quartet 2 || Naofumi Iwatani || || 
|-
| 2020 || BNA: Brand New Animal || Alan Sylvasta || || 
|-
| 2020 || Wave, Listen to Me! || Ryūsuke Kōmoto || || 
|-
| 2020 || Plunderer || Tokikaze Sakai || ||
|-
| 2020 || Get Up! Get Live! || Toranosuke Ōno || ||
|-
| 2020 || King's Raid: Successors of the Will || Kasel || || 
|-
| 2020 || Sleepy Princess in the Demon Castle || Demon Cleric || || 
|-
| 2020–present || Rent-A-Girlfriend || Umi Nakano || || 
|-
| 2020 || The Gymnastics Samurai || Atsushi Dōjima || || 
|-
| 2021 || 2.43: Seiin High School Boys Volleyball Team || Mimura Subaru || || 
|-
| 2021 || So I'm a Spider, So What? || Hugo || || 
|-
| 2021 || Kemono Jihen || Yui || || 
|-
| 2021 || Let's Make a Mug Too || Tokishirō Toyokawa || || 
|-
| 2021 || Dragon Goes House-Hunting || Dearia || || 
|-
| 2021 || Backflip!! || Ryōya Misato || || 
|-
| 2021—2022 || The Case Study of Vanitas || Noé Archiviste || || 
|-
| 2021 || Platinum End || Kanade Uryu || || 
|-
| 2022 || Tokyo 24th Ward || Koki Suido || || 
|-
| 2022 || Life with an Ordinary Guy Who Reincarnated into a Total Fantasy Knockout || Schwartz || || 
|-
| 2022 || Salaryman's Club || Sōta Saeki || || 
|-
| 2022 || A Couple of Cuckoos || Nagi Umino || || 
|-
| 2022 || The Yakuza's Guide to Babysitting || Kei Sugihara || || 
|-
| 2022 || To Your Eternity || Hairo Rich || 2nd Season || 
|-
| 2023 || Endo and Kobayashi Live! The Latest on Tsundere Villainess Lieselotte || Aoto Endō || || 
|-
| 2023 || Tomo-chan Is a Girl! || Junichiro Kubota || || 
|-
| 2023 || Saint Cecilia and Pastor Lawrence || Lawrence || || 
|-
| 2023 || Mashle || Lance Crown || || 
|-
| 2023 || My Happy Marriage || Kiyoka Kudo || || 
|-
| 2023 || My Unique Skill Makes Me OP Even at Level 1 || Ryota Sato || || 
|-
| 2023 || MF Ghost || Yōsuke Ōtani || || 
|-
| 2023 || The Kingdoms of Ruin || Adonis || || 
|}

Original video animationNazotoki-hime wa Meitantei (2012), Rikka FujisakiFantasista Stella (2014), Ryuji MorikawaHaikyu!! (2014), Tobio KageyamaAttack on Titan: Lost Girls 'Wall Sina, Goodbye' Part. B (2018), Lou

Original net animationBonjour Sweet Love Patisserie (2014), Ryō KōdukiHetalia: World Twinkle (2015), MolossiaB: The Beginning (2018), Minatsuki7 Seeds (2019), Ryusei OgiwaraBeyblade Burst Superking (2020), Lean WalhallaVlad Love (2021), OkadaKotaro Lives Alone (2022), Ryōta

Anime filmsCode Geass: Akito the Exiled (2013), Jan ManesSaint Seiya: Legend of Sanctuary (2014), Pegasus SeiyaYour Name (2016), Shinta TakagiGenocidal Organ (2017), RealandBlack Butler: Book of the Atlantic (2017), Ryan StokerMy Hero Academia: Two Heroes (2018), Iida TenyaRascal Does Not Dream of a Dreaming Girl (2019), Sakuta AzusagawaMy Hero Academia: Heroes Rising (2019), Iida TenyaBackflip!! (2022), Ryōya MisatoTsurune the Movie: The First Shot (2022), Kaito OnogiRascal Does Not Dream of a Sister Venturing Out (2023), Sakuta Azusagawa

Video gamesBravely Default (2012), OwenE.X. Troopers (2012), Ein Atelier Escha & Logy: Alchemists of the Dusk Sky (2013), Logix "Logy" FiscarioAzure Striker Gunvolt (2014), Gunvolt Super Robot Wars Original Generation Coffin of the End (2014), Sakito AsagiHero Bank 2 (2014), Sekito SakuradaSenjou no Waltz (2014), PashDevil May Cry 4: Special Edition (2015), NeroPsychedelica of the Black Butterfly (2015), HikageZettai Kaikyuu Gakuen: Eden with Roses and Phantasm (2015), Haru IgarashiPossession Magenta (2015), Taiga AobaDynamic Chord feat. Kyohso (2015), Kuroya YuuTouken Ranbu (2015), Kasen KanesadaStar Ocean 5: Integrity and Faithlessness (2016), Fidel CamuzeGundam Breaker 3 (2016), MitsukiEnsemble Stars! (2016), Tsumugi Aoba Ikemen Royal Palace: Cinderella in Midnight (2016), Alyn CrawfordOnmyōji (2016), KubinashiBungou to Alchemist (2016), Atsushi NakajimaKingdom Hearts HD 2.8 Final Chapter Prologue (2017), Foreteller GulaOVERHIT (2018), AsshikoMy Hero: One's Justice (2018), Tenya IidaShinen Resist (2018), GerardCode Vein (2019), Louis AmamiyaDevil May Cry 5 (2019), NeroFire Emblem: Three Houses (2019), Dimitri Alexandre BlaiddydGranblue Fantasy, NoaBand Yarouze,(2016) Kazuma NanaseOn Air!, (2018) Rikka YaraiSangokushi Heroes (2019), Zhou YuGrand Summoners (2019), Genos, Berwick, Swordsman Berwick, Naofumi IwataniTeppen (2019), NeroBlackStar - Theatre Starless (2019), GuiArknights (2019), ThornsYs IX: Monstrum Nox (2019), Credo Aiblinger, Hawk13 Sentinels: Aegis Rim (2019), Keitaro Miura Fate/Grand Order (2020), Daybit Sem Void, Saitō Hajime  Piofiore no Banshou (2020) Dante FalzoneNEKOPARA - Catboy's Paradise (2021), LaurierTears of Themis (2021), Marius von HagenShin Megami Tensei V (2021), Yuzuru AtsutaGrand Chase Dimensional Chaser (2021), Harpe NoirArena of Valor (2021), Genos [OPM Skin]Cookie Run: Kingdom (2021), Milk CookieSoul Hackers 2 (2022), ArrowAzure Striker Gunvolt 3 (2022), GunvoltFire Emblem Warriors: Three Hopes (2022), Dimitri Alexandre BlaiddydPunishing: Gray Raven (2022), NoanDisgaea 7 (2023), Fuji

Drama CDsShinsengumi Hokushouden Vol. 01 (????), Hajime SaitoColorful5 no Nichijou (????), Kanade HinoharaColorful5 no Bunkasai (????), Kanade HinoharaColorful5 no Kessei Hiwa (????), Kanade HinoharaHoneymoon (Drama CD) Vol. 17 (????), Keigo MakabeDYNAMIC CHORD vocal CD Series Vol. 03 (????), Yuu KuroyaGargantia on the Verdurous Planet (????), LedoNagi no Asukara Drama CD 01 (????), Tsumugu KiharaNagi no Asukara Drama CD 03 (????), Tsumugu KiharaNareru! SE, Kohei SakurazakaLike a Butterfly, Atohira

Dubbing
Live-actionChip 'n Dale: Rescue Rangers, Chip (John Mulaney)A Dog's Journey, Trent (Henry Lau)Eternals, Eros / Starfox (Harry Styles)The Guest, Luke Peterson (Brendan Meyer)Home Alone 3 (2019 NTV edition), Stan Pruitt (Seth Smith)Moonfall, Sonny Harper (Charlie Plummer)Pacific Rim: Uprising, Ilya (Levi Meaden)Pokémon Detective Pikachu, DJ (Diplo)Robot Overlords, Sean Flynn (Callan McAuliffe)St. Elmo's Fire (2022 The Cinema edition), Alec Newbury (Judd Nelson)Valerian and the City of a Thousand Planets, Sergeant Neza (Kris Wu)
AnimationAll Saints Street'', Lynn

References

External links
 Official agency profile 
 

1993 births
Living people
Japanese male video game actors
Japanese male voice actors
Male voice actors from Tokyo
Seiyu Award winners
21st-century Japanese male actors